The Thomson TO9+ is a home computer introduced by French company Thomson SA in 1986. It kept the professional look of the Thomson TO9 by using a separate keyboard (lower end models usually had an integrated keyboard).

It's based on the Thomson TO8 and fully compatible with it. This also enables it to run Thomson MO6 software. The computer was designed to be used as a Minitel server and has a built-in V23 modem (with a speed of 1200/75 bauds). This feature was accessible under BASIC and from the communication software that came with the computer. The machine was sold with a word processing program (Paragraphe), a database (Fiches & Dossiers) and a spreadsheet (Multiplan). 

Compared with the TO9, the TO9+ added:
 Basic 512
 512 KB RAM 
 double-sided floppy disk drive (640 kB)
 integrated modem
 two ports for mice or joysticks

References

6809-based home computers
Thomson computers